A cover girl is a woman whose photograph features on the front cover of a magazine.

Cover girl may also refer to:

Film and television
 Cover Girl (film), a 1944 film starring Rita Hayworth and Gene Kelly
 Cover Girl (1964 film), an Italian film of 1964
 Cover Girl (TV series), a Canadian French-language television sitcom
 Covergirl (film), a 1984 Canadian drama film
 Cover Girls (film), a 1977 American TV film
 "Cover Girl" an episode of Sex and the City

Music
 The Cover Girls, an American music group
 Cover Girl (singer), a singer who released "We Found Love"
 Cover Girl (Shawn Colvin album), 1994
 Covergirl (Groove Coverage album), 2002
Covergirl (Jared Louche and The Aliens album), 1999
 "Cover Girl" (New Kids on the Block song), 1989
 "Cover Girl", a song by RuPaul from the 2009 album Champion 
 "Cover Girl", a song by Big Time Rush from the 2011 album Elevate
 "Cover Girls" a 2017 song by Hitimpulse
 "Cover Girls" a 2008 song by Quanteisha

Other uses
 Cover Girl (G.I. Joe), a fictional character in the G.I. Joe universe
 CoverGirl, a brand of makeup

See also